Seyler is a surname, and may refer to:

Seyler family, a Swiss-German family of artists and bankers, including
 Abel Seyler (1730–1801), Swiss theatre director
 Friederike Sophie Seyler (1737/38–1789), German actress and librettist
 Ludwig Edwin Seyler (1758–1836), German banker
 Seyler theatrical company
 Berenberg-Gossler-Seyler banking dynasty
 Athene Seyler (1889–1990), English actress
 Harry E. Seyler (1908–1994), American politician and educator
 Tomas Seyler (born 1974), German darts player

See also 
 Hoppe-Seyler
 Seiler
 Sailer (disambiguation)

German-language surnames